The Tir na n-Og Awards (abbreviated TnaO) are a set of annual children's literary awards in Wales from 1976. They are presented by the Books Council of Wales to the best books published during the preceding calendar year in each of three awards categories, one English-language and two Welsh-language. Their purpose is "[to raise] the standard of children's and young people's books and to encourage the buying and reading of good books." There is no restriction to fiction or prose. Each prize is £1,000.

The awards are named for Tír na nÓg, the "Land of the Young", an otherworldly realm in Irish mythology.

The English-language award honours one book with an "authentic Welsh background" whose original language is English. It is sponsored by the British Chartered Institute of Library and Information Professionals, Cymru Wales division (CILIP/Wales), and presented at that association's annual conference in May.

The Welsh-language Primary Sector and Secondary Sector awards honour one book written for primary school children and one for secondary school children.
They are presented at the annual Urdd National Eisteddfod, recently at the beginning of June or end of May.
Since 2011, the Welsh-language awards are co-sponsored by the Cardigan-based publisher Cymdeithas Lyfrau Ceredigion.

Shortlists comprising three or four books in each awards category have been published by BCW at least from 2011.

Recent awards 

2019

The 2018/2019 cycle was completed by announcements of the English-language winner on 16 May 2019 and the two Welsh-language winners at the Urdd National Eisteddfod on 30 May.

The primary sector award went to Elin Meek and Valériane Leblond for Cymru ar y Map, a lavishly illustrated picture atlas of Wales, published by Rily Publications.

The secondary sector award went to Manon Steffan Ros for Fi a Joe Allen, a football novel about a fan following the Welsh team to France, published by Y Lolfa.

The English-language award was presented to Catherine Fisher for The Clockwork Crow, a tale of enchantment involving Welsh folklore and set in a snowy Welsh landscape, published by Firefly Press.

2016

The 2015/2016 cycle was completed by announcements of the English-language winner on 26 May 2016 and the two Welsh-language winners at the Urdd National Eisteddfod on 2 June. Three shortlists of three or four books had been announced in March.

The primary sector award went to Sian Lewis and Valériane Leblond for Pedair Cainc y Mabinogi, a retelling of the Four Branches of the Mabinogi, published by Rily Publications.

The secondary sector award went to Llyr Titus for Gwalia, a space travel adventure, published by Gomer Press.

The English-language award was presented to Griff Rowland for The Search For Mister Lloyd, about a Welsh boy's search for his missing racing pigeon, published by Candy Jar Books.

2015
The 2014/2015 cycle was completed by announcements of the English-language winner on 14 May 2015 and the two Welsh-language winners at the Urdd National Eisteddfod on 28 May. Three shortlists of three or four books had been announced 26 March.

The primary sector award went to Caryl Lewis for Straeon Gorau'r Byd, a collection of stories from all over the world, published by Gwasg Carreg Gwalch.

The secondary sector award went to Gareth F. Williams for Y Gêm, a novel about football and friendship centred on events of the First World War, notably the Christmas truce, published by Gwasg Carreg Gwalch.

The English-language award was presented on 14 May 2015 at Swansea Central Library to Giancarlo Gemin for Cowgirl, a story of two very different girls in contemporary south Wales, published by Nosy Crow.

2014
The 2013/2014 cycle was completed 29 May 2014 at the Urdd National Eisteddfod in Pembrokeshire with the presentation of the two Welsh-language awards.

The primary sector award went to Gareth F. Williams for Cwmwl dros y Cwm, a historical novel set in Senghenydd in South Wales at the time of the disastrous colliery explosion in 1913, published by Gwasg Carreg Gwalch.

The secondary sector award went to Haf Llewelyn for Diffodd y Sêr, a historical novel about the family of Welsh poet Hedd Wyn (Ellis Humphrey Evans), who died at Passchendaele, published by Y Lolfa.

The English-language award was presented 15 May 2014 at Cardiff Central Library to Wendy White for Welsh Cakes and Custard, family-based stories about two young children in contemporary Wales, published by Gomer Press.

2013
The 2012/2013 cycle was completed 30 May 2013 at the Urdd National Eisteddfod with the presentation of the two Welsh-language awards.

The primary sector award went to Iolo Williams and Bethan Wyn Jones for Cynefin yr Ardd, a book about garden wildlife, published by Gwasg Carreg Gwalch.

The secondary sector award went to Alun Wyn Bevan for Y Gêmau Olympaidd a Champau’r Cymry, a celebration of the Olympic Games with emphasis on the Welsh connection, published by Gomer Press.

The English-language award was presented 16 May 2013 at Cardiff Central Library to Cwmbran-born Daniel Morden for Tree of Leaf and Flame, a collection of stories retelling the Mabinogion, illustrated by Brett Breckon and published by Pont Books. He won the same award in 2007 for Dark Tales from the Woods.

Winners 

There was a single Welsh-language award from 1976 to 1986, followed by dual fiction and nonfiction awards from 1987 to 2005, dual Primary and Secondary awards from 2006. There has been one English-language award throughout.

All three awards have been conferred every year from 1994. Previously seven English awards and one Welsh award were withheld.

2019
 English-language: The Clockwork Crow, Catherine Fisher (her 2nd TnO Award) 
 Welsh, Primary: Cymru ar y Map, Elin Meek and Valériane Leblond  (Leblond's 2nd TnO Award) 
 Welsh, Secondary: Fi a Joe Allen, Manon Steffan Ros  (her 4th TnO Award)

2018
 English-language: The Nearest Faraway Place, Hayley Long 
 Welsh, Primary: Dosbarth Miss Prydderch a'r Carped Hud, Mererid Hopwood (her 2nd TnO Award) 
 Welsh, Secondary: Mae'r Lleuad ynGoch, Myrddin ap Dafydd (his 2nd TnO Award)

2017
 English-language: Sweet Pizza, Giancarlo Gemin (his 2nd TnO Award)
 Welsh, Primary: ABC Byd Natur, Luned Aaron 
 Welsh, Secondary: Pluen, Manon Steffan Ros (her 3rd TnO Award)

2016
 English-language: The Search for Mister Lloyd, Griff Rowland
 Welsh, Primary: Pedair Cainc Y Mabinogi, Siân Lewis (her 2nd TnO Award), illustrated by Valeriane Leblond
 Welsh, Secondary: Gwalia, Llŷr Titus

2015
 English-language: Cowgirl, Giancarlo Gemin
 Welsh, Primary: Straeon Gorau'r Byd, Caryl Lewis (her 2nd TnO Award)
 Welsh, Secondary: Y Gêm, Gareth F. Williams  (his 6th TnO Award)

2014
 English-language: Welsh Cakes and Custard, Wendy White, illustrated by Helen Flook 
 Welsh, Primary: Cwmwl dros y Cwm, Gareth F. Williams (his 5th TnO Award) 
 Welsh, Secondary: Diffodd y Sêr, Haf Llewelyn 

2013
 English-language: Tree of Leaf and Flame, Daniel Morden
 Welsh, Primary: Cynefin yr Ardd, Iolo Williams and Bethan Wyn Jones
 Welsh, Secondary: Y Gêmau Olympaidd a Champau’r Cymry, Alun Wyn Bevan

2012
 English-language: Full Moon, Jenny Sullivan
 Welsh, Primary: Prism, Manon Steffan Ros
 Welsh, Secondary: Yr Alarch Du, Rhiannon Wyn

2011
 English-language:  Three Little Sheep, Rob Lewis
 Welsh, Primary: Dirgelwch y Bont, Hywel Griffiths
 Welsh, Secondary: Stwff Guto S. Tomos, Lleucu Roberts

2010
 English-language: Dear Mr Author, Paul Manship
 Welsh, Primary: Trwy’r Tonnau, Manon Steffan Ros
 Welsh, Secondary: Codi Bwganod, Rhiannon Wyn

2009
 English-language: Merlin's Magical Creatures, Graham Howells
 Welsh, Primary: Bownsio, Emily Huws
 Welsh, Secondary: Annwyl Smotyn Bach, Lleucu Roberts

2008
 English-language: Finding Minerva, Frances Thomas
 Welsh, Primary: Y Llyfr Ryseitiau: Gwaed y Tylwyth, Nicholas Daniels
 Welsh, Secondary: Eira Mân, Eira Mawr, Gareth F. Williams

2007
 English-language: Dark Tales from the Woods, Daniel Morden
 Welsh, Primary: Ein Rhyfel Ni, Mair Wynn Hughes
 Welsh, Secondary: Adref Heb Elin, Gareth F. Williams

2006
 English-language: Tirion's Secret Journal, Jenny Sullivan
 Welsh, Primary: Carreg Ateb, Emily Huws
 Welsh, Secondary: Creadyn, Gwion Hallam

Before 2006 the dual Welsh-language awards recognised fiction and nonfiction books.
2005
 English-language: The Seal Children, Jackie Morris
 Welsh, Fiction: Eco, Emily Huws
 Welsh, Nonfiction: Byd Llawn Hud, Ceri Wyn Jones, Tudur Dylan, Mererid Hopwood, Sonia Edwards and Elinor Wyn Reynold
2004
 English-language: The Battle of Mametz Wood, 1916, Robert Phillips
 Welsh, Fiction: Iawn Boi?, Caryl Lewis
 Welsh, Nonfiction: Stori Dafydd ap Gwilym, Gwyn Thomas & Margaret Jones
2003
 English-language: Cold Jac, Rob Lewis
 Welsh, Fiction: Sgôr, Bethan Gwanas
 Welsh, Nonfiction: Dewi Sant, Rhiannon Ifans & Margaret Jones
2002
 English-language: Georgie, Malachy Doyle
 Welsh, Fiction: Gwirioni, Shoned Wyn Jones
 Welsh, Nonfiction: Poeth! Cerddi Poeth ac Oer, Non ap Emlyn & Marian Delyth
2001
 English-language: The Seeing Stone, Kevin Crossley-Holland
 Welsh, Fiction: Llinyn Trôns, Bethan Gwanas
 Welsh, Nonfiction: Jam Coch Mewn Pwdin Reis, Myrddin ap Dafydd
2000
 English-language: Artworks On ... Interiors, Jo Dahn & Justine Baldwin
 Welsh, Fiction: Ta Ta-Tryweryn, Gwenno Hughes
 Welsh, Nonfiction: Chwedlau o’r Gwledydd Celtaidd, Rhiannon Ifans & Margaret Jones

1999
 English-language: Rhian’s Song, Gillian Drake
 Welsh, Fiction: Pam Fi Eto, Duw?, John Owen
 Welsh, Nonfiction: Byw a Bod yn y Bàth, Lis Jones
1998
 English-language: Alwena’s Garden, Mary Oldham
 Welsh, Fiction: Dyddiau Cŵn, Gwen Redvers Jones
 Welsh, Nonfiction: Stori Branwen, Tegwyn Jones & Jac Jones
1997
 English-language: Cities in the Sea, Siân Lewis & Jackie Morris
 Welsh, Fiction: Ydy Fe!, John Owen
 Welsh, Nonfiction: Dirgelwch Loch Ness, Gareth F. Williams
1996
 English-language: Who’s Afraid of the Bwgan-wood?, Anne Lewis
 Welsh, Fiction: Coch yw Lliw Hunllef, Mair Wynn Hughes
 Welsh, Nonfiction: Sbectol Inc, Eleri Ellis Jones & Marian Delyth
1995
 English-language: The Candle Man, Catherine Fisher
 Welsh, Fiction: Pam Fi, Duw, Pam Fi?, John Owen
 Welsh, Nonfiction: Geiriadur Gomer i’r Ifanc, D Geraint Lewis
1994
 English-language: Denny and the Magic Pool, Pamela Purnell
 Welsh, Fiction: Sothach a Sglyfath, Angharad Tomos
 Welsh, Nonfiction: Cristion Ydw I, Huw John Hughes & Rheinallt Thomas
1993
 English-language: Award withheld
 Welsh, Fiction: ’Tisio Tshipsan?, Emily Huws
 Welsh, Nonfiction: Chwedl Taliesin, Gwyn Thomas & Margaret Jones
1992
 English-language: Who Stole a Bloater?, Frances Thomas
 Welsh, Fiction: joint winners:
 Wmffra, Emily Huws
 Broc Môr, Gwen Redvers Jones
 Welsh, Nonfiction: Yn y Dechreuad, Robert M. Morris & Catrin Stephens
1991
 English-language: Award withheld
 Welsh, Fiction:  O Ddawns i Ddawns, Gareth F. Williams
 Welsh, Nonfiction: Cymru Ddoe a Heddiw, Geraint H. Jenkins
1990
 English-language: Award withheld
 Welsh, Fiction: Llygedyn o Heulwen, Mair Wynn Hughes
 Welsh, Nonfiction: Lleuad yn Olau, T. Llew Jones & Jac Jones

1989
 English-language: Award withheld
 Welsh, Fiction: joint winners:
 Liw, Irma Chilton
 Ben y Garddwr a Storïau Eraill, Jac Jones
 Welsh, Nonfiction: Culhwch ac Olwen, Gwyn Thomas & Margaret Jones —a retelling of Culhwch and Olwen
1988
 English-language: Steel Town Cats, Celia Lucas
 Welsh, Fiction: ’Tydi Bywyd yn Boen!, Gwenno Hywyn
 Welsh, Nonfiction: Yr Atlas Cymraeg, Dafydd Orwig (editor)
1987
 English-language: The Snow Spider, Jenny Nimmo
 Welsh, Fiction: Jabas, Penri Jones
 Welsh, Nonfiction: Gardd o Gerddi, Alun Jones & John Pinion Jones

Before 1987 there were only two awards, one for English- and one for Welsh-language books.
1986
 English: Region of the Summer Stars, Frances Thomas
 Welsh: Y Llipryn Llwyd, Angharad Tomos
1985
 Awards withheld
1984
 English: The Prize, Irma Chilton
 Welsh: joint winners:
Y Llinyn Arian, Mair Wynn Hughes
Herio’r Cestyll, Malcolm M. Jones, Cyril Jones & Gwen Redvers Jones
1983
 English: Bluestones, Mary John
 Welsh: Croes Bren yn Norwy, J. Selwyn Lloyd
1982
 English: Award withheld
 Welsh: Gaeaf y Cerrig, Gweneth Lilly
1981
 English: The Blindfold Track, Frances Thomas
 Welsh: Y Drudwy Dewr, Gweneth Lilly
1980
 English: Award withheld
 Welsh: Y Llong, Irma Chilton

1979
 English: Time Circles, Bette Meyrick
 Welsh: Y Flwyddyn Honno, Dyddgu Owen
1978
 English: Silver on the Tree, Susan Cooper
 Welsh: Miriam, Jane Edwards
1977
 English: A String in the Harp, Nancy Bond
 Welsh: Trysor Bryniau Caspar, J. Selwyn Lloyd
1976
 English: The Grey King, Susan Cooper
 Welsh: Tân ar y Comin, T. Llew Jones

Winners of multiple awards 

Pont Books, the children's imprint of Gomer Press (Gwasg Gomer), has published the last nine books to win the English award, 2006 to 2014. Gwasg Gomer has also published five winners of Welsh awards during that time. Y Lolfa, Tal-y-bont published six of the eight books to win the Welsh-language awards, 2009 to 2012.

Several authors have won two awards, including all three winners in 2012 and both winners of the first awards in 1976, Susan Cooper and T. Llew Jones.

For the inaugural English Award-winning novel, The Grey King (1975), Cooper also won the Newbery Medal recognising the year's "most distinguished contribution to American literature for children". She won the third English Award in 1978 for its sequel, Silver on the Tree, the concluding Dark is Rising novel. For that series, in April 2012 she won the annual American Library Association lifetime award for "lasting contribution to young adult literature", the Margaret A. Edwards Award.

See also

References

External links
 Awards and Prizes at Welsh Books Council Children's Book Promotion  
 www.gwales.com – said to provide "full details and reviews" of the nine 2014 shortlist works

Welsh literary awards
Welsh-language literature
Welsh children's literature
British children's literary awards
Awards established in 1976
1976 establishments in the United Kingdom
English-language literary awards
Welsh-language literary awards